Hero Hindustani is a 1998 Indian Hindi-language comedy-drama film directed by Aziz Sejawal. It stars Arshad Warsi and Namrata Shirodkar in lead roles. It was screenplayed by Yunus Sajawal and written by Kader Khan.

Plot
Purushottam Agarwal shifts to London for a better standard of living. He wants his granddaughter Nikki to respect Indian culture and marry an Indian man. Initially, Nikki rejects it because she is already in love with Rohit. But, pressurized by her grandfather's stubborn attitude, she plans to move to India. In India, she meets Rommie a tourist guide. Here, she makes a plan to fool her grandfather by faking her marriage to Rommie. Then she plans to allow Rommie to act as a villainous person in front of Purushottam so that he changes his views about Indian grooms. She presents Rommie as a wealthy man in front of Purushottam. Nikki and Rommie, both initially hate each other. As per the plan, Rommie makes every attempt to act negative but destiny does not seem to support him. Every attempt takes him closer to Purushottam's heart. Will Purushottam ever come to know about the plan?

Cast
 Arshad Warsi as Rommie
 Namrata Shirodkar as Namrata 'Nikki' Agarwal
 Kader Khan as Topi
 Paresh Rawal as Dadaji / Purshotam Harnam Agarwal
 Parmeet Sethi as Rohit
 Shakti Kapoor as Cadbury
 Asrani as Cameroon 
 Bharat Kapoor as Ranveer Singh 
 Pramod Muthu as Rashid
 Shehzad Khan as The Police Officer
 Pappu Polyester
 Amitabh Bachchan as Narrator

Soundtrack

References

External links
 

1998 films
1990s Hindi-language films
Films scored by Anu Malik
Films directed by Aziz Sejawal
Indian comedy films